The government of Madagascar has granted Madarail a 25-year concession to operate the northern of the two national rail lines.  The company is investing in Madagascar's rail system.  Operations began in 2003 with one locomotive; 7 more locomotives have been purchased from the Portuguese Comboios de Portugal, the CP Class 9020.

Overview 

The shares of this company are hold at 100% by the state of Madagascar after the private investor that hold 75% of the shares desisted in April 2022.

Business development
It is planned to refurbish the line Antanananrivo-Antsirabe (159 km) that had been closed in the mid of the 1990th after passage of the cylone Ana that damaged a bridge of the river Sasaony, at 19 km from Antananarivo.

Gallery

Timeline

1980th
Dreaming and pumping out money to cover corruption spendings.

1990th
Same as the 1980th.

2008 
 4 new locomotives ordered

See also 

 History of rail transport in Madagascar
 Rail transport in Madagascar
 Transport in Madagascar
 Railway stations in Madagascar

References

External links 
 madarail.mg
 Madarail on Madacamp

Companies based in Antananarivo
Rail transport in Madagascar
Metre gauge railways in Madagascar